Alberta Clipper (also known as Enbridge's Line 67) is an oil pipeline in North America. It is owned and operated by Enbridge and is part of the extensive Enbridge Pipeline System. The pipeline runs from Hardisty, Alberta, in Canada, to Superior, Wisconsin, in the United States, integrating the company's Canadian oil sands pipeline system with the Lakehead system in the United States.

Construction on the pipeline began in summer 2008. Engineering for the Canadian portion was carried out by WorleyParsons. The majority of pipeline was built by the consortium of Michels Corporation, Precision Pipeline and US Pipeline, while Willbros Group built the portion between Sherwood Park and Hardisty, and the joint venture of Robert B Somerville and Techint Canada built three sections of the pipeline.

The pipeline was placed into service on April 1, 2010. The first shipment was moved in October 2010.

It has pump stations at Hardisty, Alberta, Kerrobert, Milden, Cromer, Glenboro, Gretna, Viking, Minnesota, Clearbrook, and Deer River. The pipeline cost US$3.3 billion.

In 2013, Enbridge applied for the expansion project. According to Enbridge, Line 67 Upgrade Project Phase 2 was completed, and entered into service in July 2015. As the United States presidential permit was still pending, oil was pumped before the Canada–US border into the Enbridge Line 3 pipeline and after the border crossing back to the Alberta Clipper.

See also
 Enbridge Northern Gateway Pipelines

References

Energy infrastructure completed in 2010
Crude oil pipelines in the United States
Oil pipelines in Canada
Canada–United States relations
Enbridge pipelines
Pipelines in Alberta
Transport buildings and structures in Manitoba
Pipelines in Saskatchewan
Oil pipelines in Wisconsin
Oil pipelines in Minnesota